Danielsite is a sulfide and sulfosalt that was first discovered in a pocket of supergene minerals in the north region of Western Australia. The mineral danielsite was named after John L. Daniels who collected the sample in which the new mineral was found. Danielsite is very fine grained and hard to observe in hand samples. It generally has a gray color with very brittle and soft physical characteristics.

Occurrence 
Danielsite occurs in the mineral anglesite as ragged polycrystalline masses typically intergrown with covellite, stromeyerite, and chalcocite. Due to its occurrence with stromeyerite  it is thought to possibly be a polymorphic replacement of galena. Danielsite was found in a gossanous pod in a white quartz vein. It has been found near Coppin Pool, Ashburton Shire, Western Australia, Australia, Austria, and Belgium.

Physical properties 
Danielsite is a metallic-gray mineral that looks a lot like stromeyerite, the main difference between the two is that stormeyerites colors are yellow to brown whereas danielsite is gray. Danielsite is very soft and brittle with only a 1.5-2.5 on the mohs hardness scale (VHN10 hardness of 38). There is no discernible type of cleavage, but due to the small size of the crystallites the possibility of cleavage can't be 100% excluded. It is a rather dense mineral weighing in at 6.541 g/cm3.

Chemical composition 

The data for this chart was gathered using a polished section by electron microprobe and using a crystal spectrometer with the following
standards: galena (S), cinnabar (Hg), and metals (Ag and Cu). The results were calculated on the basis of 23 atoms due to its chemical formula being very similar to balkanite.

X-Ray crystallography

The sample found was ground up and an X-ray powder diffraction was done to the powder. The pattern had a few places that appeared to be anglesite but overall the pattern didn't match up with any other mineral known. Most of the values could be measured on a triclinic unit cell but the d values of the actual data and calculated data varied by a lot. Most sulfides do not belong to the triclinic system as well, so it was thought that this was the wrong choice for danielsite. More research was done on this mineral by Nickel and Kato and they both came to the conclusion that danielsite has an orthorhombic unit cell. When they tried calculating the d values based on the orthorhombic system the values came back very similar. Even though danielsite and balkanite have very similar chemical formulas their unit cells are vastly different. From the reported occurrences of the two minerals it is apparent that balkanite is the high temperature form and danielsite is the low-temperature form.

See also 
List of Minerals
Classification of minerals

References 

Sulfide minerals
Sulfosalt minerals